MHF is Marburg hemorrhagic fever, renamed Marburg virus disease.

MHF may also refer to:

 Mamaa language (by ISO 639 code)
 Morichal Airport, in Columbia (by IATA code)